Logistic Regiment may refer to:
Logistic Regiment (Denmark)
Logistic Regiment (Sweden)